Burnett is a Scottish surname. It is derived from a nickname from the Old French , brunette, which is a diminutive of brun meaning "brown", "dark brown".

People with the surname

 A. J. Burnett (b. 1977), American professional baseball player
 Alaina Burnett (b. 1977), Canadian voice actor 
 Alan Burnett (b. 1950), American television writer-producer 
 Alex Burnett (born 1987), baseball pitcher
 Alexander Burnett (disambiguation), several people
Alexander Burnett of Leys (died 1619), Laird of Crathes Castle
Alexander Burnett (figure skater) in 1961 U.S. Figure Skating Championships
Alexander Burnett (politician) (born 1973), Member of the Scottish Parliament
Alexander Burnett (musician), Australian singer, songwriter and music producer
Sir Alexander Burnett, 2nd Baronet (died 1663) of the Burnett baronets
Sir Alexander Burnett, 4th Baronet (died 1758) of the Burnett baronets
Sir Alexander Burnett, 9th Baronet (1789–1856) of the Burnett baronets
Sir Alexander Edwin Burnett, 14th Baronet (1881–1959) of the Burnett baronets
 Allan Burnett (1925–2007), Scottish anarchist activist
 Anne Valliant Burnett Tandy (1900–1980), American heiress
 Bill Burnett (1917–1994), South African archbishop
 Bobby Burnett (b. 1943), American football player
 Brian Burnett (1913–2011), British Royal Air Force officer
 Bryan Burnett, Scottish radio and television personality
 Calvin Burnett (disambiguation), several people
 Calvin Burnett (artist) (1921–2007), American artist and illustrator
 Calvin Burnett (Guyanese cricketer) (born 1954), Guyanese cricketer
 Calvin Burnett (Scottish cricketer) (born 1990), Scottish cricketer
 Carol Burnett (b. 1933), American comedian
 Charles Burnett (disambiguation)
Charles Burnett of the Burnett baronets
Charles Burnett III (died 2018), British land-speed record holder for steam driven vehicle
Charles Burnett (British Army officer) (1843–1910), British Army general
Charles Burnett (director) (born 1944), American film director
Charles Burnett (officer of arms) (born 1940), Scottish Officer of Arms
Charles Burnett (politician) (1875–1947), New Zealand politician
Charles Burnett (RAF officer) became Australian Chief of the Air Staff
Charles Hiram Burnett Sr., treasurer of the city of Seattle and businessman
 Colby Burnett, American Jeopardy! contestant and teacher
 Cynthia S. Burnett (1840–1932), American educator, lecturer, reformer, editor
 David Burnett (photojournalist), American photojournalist
 David Burnett (politician) (b. 1942 or 1943), Arkansas politician and former judge
 Deontay Burnett (born 1997), American football player
 Dick Burnett (musician), American country singer
 Emily Burnett (born 1997), Welsh actress
 Erin Burnett, American financial analyst and reporter
 Frances Hodgson Burnett (1849–1924), born Frances Eliza Hodgson, English author
 Garrett Burnett (1975–2022), Canadian ice hockey player
 George Burnett (disambiguation)
George Burnett (ice hockey) (born 1962), National Hockey League coach
George Burnett (officer of arms) (1822–1890), Lord Lyon King of Arms
George Burnett (writer) (1776?–1811), English nonconformist minister, known as a writer
George Burnett Barton (1836–1901), Australian lawyer
George H. Burnett (1853–1927), Oregon Supreme Court Chief Justice
George Murray Burnett (1921–1980), mathematician and chemist
George Ritter Burnett (1858–1908), United States Army officer and Medal of Honor recipient
 Georgina Burnett (born 1978), Australian-born British television presenter
 Gilbert Thomas Burnett (1800 – 1835) British botanist
 Graham Burnett (born 1965), New Zealand cricketer
 Gregg Burnett (born 1987), Scottish footballer
 Henry Cornelius Burnett (1825–1866) American politician
 Henry John Burnett (1942–1963), last man to be hanged in Scotland
 Henry Lawrence Burnett (1838–1916), American lawyer, Judge Advocate and colonel
 Howard Burnett (disambiguation), several people
Howard J. Burnett (1929–2019), American president of Washington & Jefferson College
Howard Burnett (athlete) (born 1961), Jamaican track and field athlete
 Hugh Burnett (1918–1991), African-Canadian civil rights leader
 Hugh Burnett (producer) (1924–2011), British television producer and cartoonist
 Ian Burnett, Baron Burnett of Maldon (b. 1958), Lord Chief Justice of England & Wales
 Ivy Compton-Burnett (1884–1969), English novelist
 Jamie Burnett, Scottish snooker player
 Jason Burnett (b. 1986), Canadian trampoline gymnast
 Jean L. Burnett (1871–1907), New York politician
 Jesse Burnett (b. 1946) American boxer
 John Burnett (disambiguation), several people
 John Burnett, Baron Burnett (born 1945), British politician, Member of Parliament
 John Burnett (advocate) (c. 1764–1810), Scottish advocate and judge
 John Burnett (colonial secretary) (1781–1860), colonial secretary of Van Diemens Land
 John Burnett (cricketer) (1840–1878), English cricketer
 John Burnett (footballer) (born 1939), English association (soccer) footballer
 John Burnett (historian) (1925–2006), English social historian
 John Burnett (judge) (1831–1890), American judge on the Oregon Supreme Court
 John Burnett (merchant) (1729–1784), Aberdeen merchant
 John Burnett (priest) (fl. 1955–1969), Australian Anglican priest
 John Burnett (rugby league), English rugby league footballer who played in the 1950s and 1960s
 John Burnett (trade unionist) (1842–1914), British trade unionist and civil servant
 John George Burnett (1876–1962), British politician, Member of Parliament
 John Harrison Burnett (1922–2007), British botanist and mycologist
 John L. Burnett (1854–1919), U.S. Representative from Alabama
 John Napier Burnett (1899–1989), Canadian educator
 Johnny Burnett (baseball) (1904–1959), American baseball player
 Joseph Burnett (1899–1941), Australian naval officer
 Justin Burnett (b. 1973), American film composer
 Kaelin Burnett (b. 1989), American football player
 Karl Burnett (b. 1976), New Zealand actor
 Kevin Burnett (b. 1982), American football player
 Leo Burnett (1891–1971), American advertising executive
 Margaret Burnett (b. 1949), American computer scientist
 Mark Burnett (b. 1960), British-born American television producer
 Maud Burnett (1863—1950), English politician
 Max Burnett (b. 1969), American TV & film writer, director and producer
 McKinley Burnett (1897–1968), American school desegregation pioneer
 Mikey Burnett (b. 1974), American mixed martial artist              
 Nastassja Burnett (b. 1992), Italian tennis player
 O. H. Burnett (1872–1906), American politician and lawyer
 Paul Burnett (1943), English radio disc jockey
 Peter Hardeman Burnett (1807–1895), first civilian American Governor of California
 Richard Burnett, Canadian writer, editor, journalist and columnist
 Richie Burnett (b. 1967), Welsh professional darts player
 Rob Burnett (American football) (b. 1967), American football player
 Rob Burnett (producer) (b. 1962), former head writer for David Letterman
 Ron Burnett (b. 1947), British author, professor
 Samuel Burk Burnett (1849–1922), American cattleman and rancher from Texas
 Sean Burnett (b. 1982), American baseball player
 Simon Burnett (b. 1983), British swimmer
 Stefan Corbin Burnett, better known as MC Ride, singer for Death Grips
 Suzanne Rochon-Burnett (1935–2006), Canadian businesswoman
 T Bone Burnett (b. 1948), born Joseph Henry Burnett, American singer songwriter
 Thomas Stuart Burnett (1853–1888), Scottish sculptor
 Sir Thomas Burnett, 3rd Baronet (1658–1714)
 Tom Burnett (1963–2001), American COO
 Walter Burnett Jr. (b. 1963), American politician
 Wayne Burnett (b. 1971), English football player and manager
 Webbie Burnett (born 1967), American football player
 William Burnett (disambiguation)
 William Burnett (1779–1861), British physician
 William Burnett (mayor), politician from New Zealand, see Mayor of Dunedin
 William Burnett (preacher), president of Franklin College, New Athens, Ohio
 William Farquharson Burnett (c. 1837 – 1863), senior officer in the Royal Navy
 W. R. Burnett (William Riley Burnett, 1899–1982), American novelist and screenwriter

Characters 
 Bronc Burnett, central character in a series of children's books by Wilfred McCormick

See also
Burnet (surname)
House of Burnett
Brown (surname), a perhaps similar surname

References

ru:Бёрнетт